John Barrymore (born John Sidney Blyth; 1882–1942) was an American actor of stage, screen and radio who appeared in more than 40 plays, 60 films and 100 radio shows. He was the youngest child of the actors Maurice Barrymore and Georgie Drew Barrymore, and his two siblings were Lionel and Ethel; together they were known as America's "Royal Family" of actors, and John was "perhaps the most influential and idolized actor of his day", according to his biographer Martin F. Norden.

After Barrymore tried to start a career in art, becoming an illustrator at the New York Evening Journal, his father tempted him to appear on stage in 1901 in A Man of the World; the theater proved more interesting than the newspaper industry, and he quickly changed professions. In 1904 he appeared in his first stage show on Broadway, where he appeared in light comedies and musicals until 1914 when he began to turn to more serious roles, starting with The Yellow Ticket and Kick In. That year he also began to work in full-length films, and appeared in nine between 1914 and 1918, all of them slapstick or farce comedies. During the 1920s film roles became more serious, and he appeared in the lead role in Dr. Jekyll and Mr. Hyde (1920), which he followed with The Lotus Eater (1921), Sherlock Holmes (1922), Beau Brummel (1924) and The Sea Beast (1926). In between his film roles, he also took the lead in two major stage productions of Shakespeare. In 1920 he played Richard, Duke of Gloucester in Richard III; although a success, the play closed after only 31 performances when Barrymore "collapsed from the physical and psychological challenges of the role". In November 1922 he played the title character in Hamlet on Broadway for 101 performances, before touring the US until January 1924; Norden described the critics' reaction as "universally praising the production as the best Hamlet they had ever seen". After the US tour, Barrymore took the production to London, where it ran for a further 68 performances; The Manchester Guardian later described the first performance as "the most memorable first night for years".

Such was the success of Hamlet, that Warner Bros. signed Barrymore to a film contract. When his time with Warner Bros. finished, he signed a contract with United Artists to make three features: The Beloved Rogue (1927), Tempest (1928) and Eternal Love (1929). When that contract ended he returned to Warner Bros. for five further films, and was then picked up by Metro-Goldwyn-Mayer, where he appeared in Grand Hotel, A Bill of Divorcement and Rasputin and the Empress (all 1932). At the end of the MGM contract he became "a journeyman movie actor", in the words of Norden. In September 1940 Barrymore was invited to leave his imprint in the forecourt of Grauman's Chinese Theatre; instead of the traditional handprint, Barrymore left his facial profile, reflecting his nickname "The Great Profile". He was inducted to the Hollywood Walk of Fame on February 8, 1960.

Although Barrymore appeared in a number of successful films in the 1930s, including Counsellor at Law (1933) and Twentieth Century (1934), his increasing alcoholism led to memory loss and the inability to remember his lines. His problems with alcohol affected his confidence and he admitted to Helen Hayes, his co-star of Night Flight, that he had "completely lost [his] nerve" and that he "could never appear before an audience instead". In 1935 he was hospitalized after being unable to remember neither his seven lines for the film Hat, Coat, and Glove, nor his character's name. After his discharge from the hospital he enjoyed a brief career revival, although much of his film work "bore little distinction", according to Norden; the film historians Donald McCaffrey and Christopher Jacobs opine that Barrymore's "contribution to the art of cinematic acting began to fade" after the mid-1930s. Barrymore also enjoyed a fruitful career on radio, which included broadcasting six of Shakespeare's plays in a Streamlined Shakespeare series. Much of his radio work was in the 74 episodes of The Sealtest Show with Rudy Vallée; it was during a rehearsal for the show in May 1942 that Barrymore collapsed and was admitted to hospital, where he died on May 29.

Stage appearances

Filmography

Radio broadcasts

Notes and references

Notes

References

Sources

External links 

 
 
 
 
 1916 Famous Players-Paramount portrait(Wayback Machine)
  Broadway plays portrait gallery(Museum of City of New York)

Male actor filmographies
American filmographies